Naran is a district (bag) in the Govi-Altai Aimag of Mongolia, in the Yesönbulag sum to the east of the Aimag-capital Altai City. It is located at 46°6'0N 96°30'0E with an altitude of 2212 metres (7260 feet).

References

See also
Naran, Sükhbaatar

Populated places in Mongolia